Maria Olsen (born July 22, 1966) is a South African film producer and actress known for her many roles in horror films.  These include Paranormal Activity 3, The Lords of Salem, Gore Orphanage, and Starry Eyes.  Non-horror roles include Percy Jackson & the Olympians: The Lightning Thief.

Early life 
Olsen was born on July 22, 1966, in East London, Eastern Cape, South Africa.

Career 
Olsen has appeared in over 100 roles since 2005.  Many of these are supporting roles, which she credits as allowing her to work on more projects than actors who focus primarily on leading roles.  She says her favorite roles have been in African Gothic, Percy Jackson, Die-ner (Get It?), The Haunting of Whaley House, and Live-In Fear, which was the first film she produced.

In 2011, she founded the production company MOnsterworks66.

In 2018, Olsen starred in, "The Exorcist: Forbidden Screening," a 4D theater attraction at Warner Bros. "Horror Made Here: A Festival of Frights."  The attraction took place inside the Midwest St. Church on the Warner Brothers backlot, and Olsen played the role of the host of the horror attraction, based on the 1973 film, The Exorcist.

Filmography

Film

Personal life 
Olsen came to America in January 2005.  Her hobbies include reading and knitting.  She is out as a lesbian.

References

External links 
 

Living people
21st-century South African actresses
People from East London, Eastern Cape
South African lesbian actresses
South African LGBT entertainers
South African film actresses
1966 births